Pinette Park Provincial Park is a provincial park in Prince Edward Island, Canada located along the Pinette River.

References

Provincial parks of Prince Edward Island
Parks in Queens County, Prince Edward Island